Awaran (Balochi and ), is the main city of Awaran District in the Balochistan province of Pakistan. As well serving as the district headquarters the town is also the tehsil headquarters and a Union Council.

References

Populated places in Awaran District